Nikolaus "Niki" Mondt (born 9 August 1978 in Düsseldorf) is a German former professional ice hockey player. He began and later returned to complete his playing hockey career with Düsseldorfer EG in the Deutsche Eishockey Liga (DEL).

Playing career
Mondt began his pro career with Düsseldorfer EG during the 1995–96 season, playing 14 games and winning the DEL championship, though he did not dress for a playoff game. In the years following, Mondt was among the top performers on the team until the club was relegated to the 2nd Bundesliga in 1998. He then played two seasons for the Kassel Huskies until he rejoined Düsseldorfer EG when they were promoted back to the top level.

The Ingolstadt Panthers added Mondt during the 2002–03 season, where he would be named a DEL All-Star each of the following two seasons.

After a season with Kölner Haie, Mondt signed with the Hannover Scorpions in 2006. With the Scorpions he again won the DEL championship in 2010, appearing in (an injury-shortened) five post-season games. In 2012 Mondt came back to his hometown Düsseldorf where he plays for Düsseldorfer EG again.

International play
Mondt appeared in the 1999 IIHF World Championship for the German national team, as well as in 1995, representing their junior team.

Career statistics

Awards and achievements
 DEL Champion - 1996, 2010.
 Deutscher Eishockey-Pokal Champion - 2005
 DEL All-Star - 1999–00, 2003–04, 2004–05

References

External links
 

1978 births
DEG Metro Stars players
Düsseldorfer EG players
ERC Ingolstadt players
Hannover Scorpions players
Kassel Huskies players
Kölner Haie players
Living people
German ice hockey right wingers
Sportspeople from Düsseldorf